Liang Dejin (born 1 November 1960) is a Chinese wrestler. He competed at the 1984 Summer Olympics and the 1988 Summer Olympics.

References

External links 
 

1960 births
Living people
Chinese male sport wrestlers
Olympic wrestlers of China
Wrestlers at the 1984 Summer Olympics
Wrestlers at the 1988 Summer Olympics
Place of birth missing (living people)
20th-century Chinese people
21st-century Chinese people